"Buzz!!" The Movie is the third live VHS released by Japanese rock duo B'z. It was later released on DVD, on March 14, 2001.

Track listing
Blowin'

Oh! Girl
Love Me, I Love You
Time
Taiyou no Komachi Angel (太陽のKomachi Angel)
Koi-Gokoro
Mou Ichidou Kiss Shitakatta (もう一度キスしたかった)
Don't Leave Me
Love Phantom
Negai (ねがい)
Bad Communication
Jap The Ripper
Zero
Alone
Hadashi No Megami (裸足の女神)

External links
B'z Official Website

B'z video albums
1996 video albums
Live video albums
1996 live albums
B'z live albums
Bertelsmann Music Group live albums
Bertelsmann Music Group video albums